Ogygopsis is a genus of trilobite from the Cambrian of Antarctica and North America, specifically the Burgess Shale. It is the most common fossil in the Mt. Stephen fossil beds there, but rare in other Cambrian faunas. Its major characteristics are a prominent glabella with eye ridges, lack of pleural spines, a large spineless pygidium about as long as the thorax or cephalon, and its length: up to 12 cm.

Sources

 Fossils (Smithsonian Handbooks) by David Ward (Page 64)
 Ogygopsis in the Paleobiology Database

External links 

 

Corynexochida genera
Dorypygidae
Cambrian trilobites
Burgess Shale fossils
Trilobites of Antarctica
Trilobites of North America
Paleozoic life of Newfoundland and Labrador